The US Post Office Garage was a historic vehicle maintenance facility at 135 A Street in the South Boston neighborhood of Boston, Massachusetts.  The two story building was designed in the International Style by Gilbert Underwood and completed in 1941 by a construction team headed by John Volpe.  It was built out of reinforced concrete and steel.  Its exterior was scored in a way to give the appearance of paneling, and had large expanses of steel sash windows that typified the International style.  Its rounded corners gave it a streamlined appearance.

The building was listed on the National Register of Historic Places in 1986.  It has since been demolished.

Gallery

See also 
National Register of Historic Places listings in southern Boston, Massachusetts

References 

Post office buildings on the National Register of Historic Places in Massachusetts
Buildings and structures in Boston
National Register of Historic Places in Boston
South Boston